Manuel Becerra Bermúdez (20 October 1820 – 19 December 1896) was a Spanish politician, mathematician and revolutionary. A Republican who would later embrace monarchism, he went on to assume the ministerial portfolios of Overseas and Development during the Sexenio Democrático, returning for two additional spells as Overseas minister during the regency of Maria Christina of Austria.

Biography

Early life and revolutionary activity 
Born in Santa María del Otero, Castro de Rey, province of Lugo, on 20 October 1820. Son to a math teacher, he did not complete studies in Engineering.

Following the 1856 counter-revolutionary involution by O'Donnell, Becerra entered in combat in the Plaza de Santo Domingo at the helm of a light battalion of the National Militia trying to defend the Constitutional liberties side by side  against a battalion of Jägers sent by O'Donnell, and was forced to exile.

Sexenio democrático 

After the 1868 Glorious Revolution, Becerra became a member of the Junta Superior Revolucionaria. Along  and Cristino Martos he would become one of the leaders of the so-called , the monarchist democrats part of the 1868–1871 Provisional Government.

In July 1869, during the Regency of Marshal Serrano, he was appointed as Minister of Overseas. A founding member of the Spanish Abolitionist Society back in 1864, he took measures during his first ministerial tenure towards the abolition of slavery in Puerto Rico, presenting two projects in 1869, which were not welcomed either by his cabinet peers or from the parliament. After months of fierce resistance to the ministerial initiatives from pro-slavery legislators such as Antonio Cánovas del Castillo or Francisco Romero Robledo, Becerra was forced to resign in March 1870 amid intense pressure.

Already entered the reign of Amadeo, during the premiership of Manuel Ruiz Zorrilla, Becerra was appointed as Minister of Development in December 1872, replacing José Echegaray. On 11 February 1873, in a vote at the Cortes during the same session in which the declaration of the First Republic was proclaimed, he was confirmed as Minister of Development (with 266 votes in favour). He would however leave the ministry by late February.

Bourbon Restoration and later life 

 
Following the Bourbon Restoration, Becerra joined the Liberal Fusionist Party led by Práxedes Mateo Sagasta as part of its left-leaning faction. He left the fusionists in 1881 to create along Segismundo Moret, Eugenio Montero Ríos and José López Domínguez the Dynastic Left.

An initiated Freemason (symbol: Fortaleza; grade: 33), Becerra was chosen as Grand Master of the Grand Orient of Spain in 1884; after his departure from the post in 1886, the organization was thrown into chaos and divided into factions.

Elected to the Royal Academy of Sciences in 1885, he took office as numerary member (Medal #36) on 18 November 1886, reading a discourse titled Evolución de la Matemática e influencia que en los progresos de esta ciencia ejerció la civilización árabe ("Evolution of Mathematics and the influence of the Arab civilization on the progress of this science"), replied by Eduardo Saavedra.

Becerra returned to the ministry of Overseas in two occasions: from December 1888 to January 1890 and from March 1894 to November 1894, as part of cabinets presided by Sagasta.

References
Citations

Bibliography
 
 
 
 
 
 
 
 
 
 
 
 
 

1820 births
1896 deaths
Spanish revolutionaries
19th-century Spanish mathematicians
Spanish Freemasons
Spanish abolitionists
Prisoners and detainees of Spain
Overseas ministers of Spain
Public works ministers of Spain
Exiled Spanish politicians
Government ministers during the First Spanish Republic